Shane Niemi (born August 2, 1995), known by his stage name iamnotshane (stylized in all lowercase), is an American singer and songwriter.

Known for his flamboyant dance style, his music video for his 2016 song "Insecure" became viral, which includes a version of Michael Jackson's anti-gravity lean and has been viewed over 5 million times

History
Niemi was born in Los Angeles. He has been performing since the age of 8 and began writing original songs at age 12.
In 2014, he posted his first music video for "Sinister". A year later he released his first EP Sad. In 2016, his music video for "Insecure" went viral and  has 6.5 million views on YouTube.

He later changed his stage name to iamnotshane and released his self-titled EP iamnotshane in 2020 through Avant Garden and Island Records.

In 2020, French producer and DJ Michael Calfan did a remix of Afterlife.

For unknown reasons, he left Avant Garden and Island Records and began releasing singles independently in late 2020.

In 2021, he gave an interview for the fashion magazine Vanity Teen, recounting his beginnings as an artist and his current influence.

Discography

Extended plays

Singles
 "Sinister" (2014)
 "Insecure" (2016)
 "Dance" (2017)
 "Losers" (2017)
 "Play Good Music at My Funeral" (2017)
 "Trick" (2018)
 "Lifeguard" (2018)
 "Afterlife" (2019)
 "Security" (2019)
 "Back to You" (2019)
 "Perfect" (2020)
 "What a Perfect Day for Crying" (2020)
 "I'm Leaving, Sorry for Your Loss" (2020)
 "Unemotional" (2020)
 "Paint a Smile on That Face!" (2020)
 "Ugly Thoughts" (2020)
 "Just Buried!" (2020)
 "Feelings an How to Destroy Them" (2021)
 "Punch Me in the Face" (2021)
 "Don't Say That" (2021)
 "Maybe My Soulmate Died" (2022)
 "what doesn't kill you mutates and tries again" (2022)

References

1995 births
Living people
21st-century American singers
American male pop singers
American child singers
American dance musicians
American male dancers
American male singer-songwriters
21st-century American male singers
People from Los Angeles
Singers from Los Angeles
Singer-songwriters from California